Playhatch (or Play Hatch) is a hamlet in the civil parish of Eye & Dunsden in South Oxfordshire, England, about  northeast of Reading, Berkshire.

Overview
Before 1866, Playhatch formed part of the Oxfordshire section of Sonning civil parish. Berry Brook starts close to the Redgrave-Pinsent Rowing Lake to the southwest, running northeast through the River Thames floodplain past Playhatch, under the B478 Playhatch Road near the Sonning Works, before joining the river at Hallsmead Ait.

Amenities

Just south of the hamlet is the Redgrave-Pinsent Rowing Lake. The hamlet has three public houses:
 The Crown, a 16th-century coaching inn
 The Flowing Spring, controlled by Fuller's Brewery
 The Shoulder of Mutton

See also
 List of places in Oxfordshire

References

External links
 

Sonning
Hamlets in Oxfordshire